The Slave Girl may refer to:

 The Slave Girl (film), 1915 American short Western
 Slave Girl (film) a 1947 film
 The Slave Girl (play), 1530 Croatian drama
 Slave Girl (novel), 2007 Australian  	children's historical novel
 The Slave Girl (novel), 1977 novel by Buchi Emecheta
 Slave Girl, a fictional character, later renamed Sophie, in Brian K. Vaughan's comic book series Saga